The Star Amphitheatre was an open air temple constructed by the Order of the Star in the East, which at the time was an organisation founded to promote the works of, and involve followers of Jiddu Krishnamurti.   The Order of the Star in the East has been continually associated with being a branch of the Theosophical Society, however no formal affiliation between either organisation has ever been publicly confirmed. However, The Order of the Star in the East was founded by the President of the Theosophical Society, Annie Besant, because Krishnamurti was seen as the Theosophical Society's "World Teacher" so an association between the two organisations did exist.   The Star Amphitheatre was constructed in 1923–1924 at Balmoral Beach in Sydney, Australia.

It was intended as a platform for lectures by the expected 'World Teacher', widely believed at the time to be Jiddu Krishnamurti, and cost around 10,000 pounds. It was demolished in 1951.

A persistent urban legend in Sydney says that the Amphitheatre was built in anticipation of the second coming, when it would provide a viewing platform for Jesus Christ's walking across the water either through, or between Sydney Heads. Some versions of the story include tickets for the spectacle being sold to a gullible public.

References

External links
ABC Radio National Encounter: Krishnamurti
Jesus is Coming - Sermon by Fr Tony Noble of All Saint's 
Episcopal Church San Diego quoting the Jesus myth
The Star Amphitheatre Balmoral

Buildings and structures demolished in 1951
Theosophy
Former theatres in Sydney
Jiddu Krishnamurti